Benoitia is a genus of funnel weavers first described by Pekka T. Lehtinen in 1967.

Species
, the World Spider Catalog accepted 10 species:

Benoitia agraulosa (Wang & Wang, 1991) – China
Benoitia bornemiszai (Caporiacco, 1947) – East Africa
Benoitia deserticola (Simon, 1910) – Namibia, Botswana
Benoitia lepida (O. Pickard-Cambridge, 1876) – Spain, North Africa, Turkey, Cyprus, Israel, Yemen, Saudi-Arabia, Kuwait, Iraq, Iran
Benoitia ocellata (Pocock, 1900) – South Africa
Benoitia raymondeae (Lessert, 1915) – East Africa
Benoitia rhodesiae (Pocock, 1901) – Southern Africa
Benoitia tadzhika (Andreeva, 1976) – European Russia to Central Asia 
Benoitia timida (Audouin, 1826) – Egypt, Israel
Benoitia upembana (Roewer, 1955) – Congo

References

External links

Agelenidae
Araneomorphae genera
Cosmopolitan spiders
Taxa named by Pekka T. Lehtinen